Events from the year 1804 in the United Kingdom.

Incumbents
 Monarch – George III
 Prime Minister – Henry Addington (Tory) (until 10 May), William Pitt the Younger (Tory) (starting 10 May)
 Foreign Secretary – Lord Hawkesbury (until 14 May) Dudley Ryder, 1st Earl of Harrowby (from 14 May)
 Parliament – 2nd

Events
 January –  flounders on patrol off Scotland, apparently striking the Inchcape rock, with the loss of all 491 on board.
 3 January – Hammersmith Ghost murder case.
 21 February – the Cornishman Richard Trevithick's newly built "Penydarren" steam locomotive operates on the Merthyr Tramroad between Penydarren Ironworks in Merthyr Tydfil and Abercynon in South Wales, following several trials since 13 February, the world's first locomotive to work on rails.
 7 March
 John Wedgwood founds the Royal Horticultural Society as the Horticultural Society of London. Another founding member, William Forsyth, dies on 25 July.
 Thomas Charles is instrumental in founding the Bible Society.
 2 April – forty merchant vessels are wrecked when a convoy led by HMS Apollo runs aground off Portugal.
 5 April – High Possil meteorite, the first recorded meteorite to fall in Scotland in modern times, falls at Possil.
 26 April – Henry Addington resigns as Prime Minister.
 10 May – William Pitt the Younger begins his second premiership as Prime Minister.
 12 December – Spain declares war on Britain.
 21 December – Rochdale Canal opens, the first to cross the Pennines.

Ongoing
 Anglo-Spanish War, 1796–1808
 Napoleonic Wars, 1803–1815

Undated
 Construction of Martello towers to protect the coasts of south east England and Ireland against the threat of French invasion is begun, together with (from 30 October) the Royal Military Canal.
 Marlborough White Horse cut in Wiltshire.
 William Blake writes Milton: a Poem including the poem And did those feet in ancient time.
 William Wordsworth writes I Wandered Lonely as a Cloud.

Births
Early February – James Bronterre O'Brien, Irish-born Chartist leader, reformer and journalist (died 1864)
4 April – Andrew Nicholl, Irish-born painter (died 1886)
20 July – James Kay-Shuttleworth, educationist (died 1877)
6 November – Benjamin Hall Kennedy, Latin scholar and promoter of women's higher education (died 1889)
21 December – Benjamin Disraeli, Prime Minister (died 1881)

Deaths
4 January – Charlotte Lennox, author and poet (born 1727)
15 January – Dru Drury, entomologist (born 1725)
6 February – Joseph Priestley, chemist (born 1733)
4 August – Adam Duncan, 1st Viscount Duncan, Scottish-born admiral (born 1731)
29 October – Sarah Crosby, Methodist preacher (born 1729)
23 November – Richard Graves, writer (born 1715)

See also
 1804 in Scotland

References

 
Years of the 19th century in the United Kingdom